Hanen is a surname. Notable people with the surname include:

Andrew Hanen (born 1953), American judge
Marsha Hanen (1938–2019), Canadian academic and university administrator
Nora Hanen, character in the soap opera One Life to Live